Lokomotiv Novosibirsk is a Russian professional volleyball club, based in Novosibirsk, playing in Russian Volleyball Super League.

Achievements
 CEV Champions League
  (x1) 2013
 FIVB Club World Championship
  (x1) 2013
 Russian Championship
  (x1) 2020
  (x2) 2014, 2022
  (x2) 2017, 2021
 Russian Cup 
  (x2) 2010, 2011

Team Rosters
Team roster - season 2021/2022

Notable players
Notable, former or current players of club, who are medalist of intercontinental tournaments in national teams or clubs.

See also
 Russia men's national volleyball team

References

External links
Official Website 
CEV profile

Russian volleyball clubs
Sport in Novosibirsk
Volleyball clubs established in 1977
1977 establishments in Russia